Waters of the Moon is a 1951 stage play by N. C. Hunter which originally ran for two years at the Theatre Royal Haymarket from 1951 to 1953. It was adapted into a 1961 TV play broadcast by the Australian Broadcasting Corporation. This version was directed by Christopher Muir.
In 1977 it was revived at the Theatre Royal Haymarket with Ingrid Bergman as Helen Lancaster and Wendy Hiller, who had appeared in the original 1951 production, now playing the role of Mrs. Whyte.

It was also televised by ITV (H.M. Tennent for ATV) on 14 November 1956, in the Play of the Week strand and by the BBC on 27 December 1959, 24 December 1968 and 30 December 1983.

Cast (original West End stage - 1951)
Edith Evans as Helen Lancaster
Sybil Thorndike as Mrs. Whyte
Wendy Hiller as Evelyn Daly
Directed by Frith Banbury

Cast (BBC Radio version - 1955)
Sonia Dresdel as Helen Lancaster
Directed by Val Gielgud

1961 Australian Television Version

The play was adapted for Australian TV by the ABC. It was directed by Christopher Muir.

Premise
A woman, Helen Lancaster, is caught in a house during a snowstorm and forced to spend time there with her husband and daughter.

Helen flirts with an Austrian, Julias.

Cast
Patricia Kennedy as Helen Lancaster
Barbara Brandon as Mrs Whyte
Kurt Ludeski as Julias Wintelhalter
Leslie Pope as Evelyn Daly
Robin Hardiman as John Daly
Cyril Gardiner as Colonel Selby
Agnes Dobson as Mrs Daly
Myrtle Woods as Mrs Ashworth
Jane Norris as Conetta Landi
Michael Duffield as Robert Lancaster
Ric Hutton
Leonard Teale
Anne Haddy
Jack Ford
James Workman

Production
It was Patricia Kennedy's first TV play since Black Limelight.

Cast (BBC Radio version - 1965)
Coral Browne as Helen Lancaster
Virginia Maskell as Evelyn Daly

Cast (BBC1 version - 1968)
Margaret Leighton as Helen Lancaster
Vivien Merchant as Evelyn Daly
Athene Seyler as Mrs. Whyte
Kathleen Harrison as Mrs. Ashworth
Michael Gwynn as Julius Winterhalter
Roland Culver as Colonel Selby
Produced by Cedric Messina
Directed by Herbert Wise

Cast (BBC1 version - 1983)
Penelope Keith as Helen Lancaster
Virginia McKenna as Mrs. Whyte
Ronald Pickup as Julius Winterhalter
Joan Sims as Mrs. Ashworth
Richard Vernon as Colonel Selby
Dilys Laye as Mrs. Daly
Geoffrey Palmer as Robert Lancaster
Lesley Dunlop as Evelyn Daly
Phoebe Nicholls as Tonetta Landi
Produced by Cedric Messina
Directed by Piers Haggard

References

External links

Australian television plays
Australian television plays based on operas
Australian Broadcasting Corporation original programming
English-language television shows
Television shows produced by Associated Television (ATV)
1951 plays
1959 television plays
1961 television plays
1968 television plays
1983 television plays
West End plays
Plays by N.C. Hunter